The Order of Nemanjići is an Order of the Republika Srpska. It is established in 1993 by the Constitution of Republika Srpska and 'Law on orders and awards' valid since 28 April 1993.

This order is awarded for prominent military feats in the armed struggle, as well as organizing and leading the defense of the Serbian people and state.

It is named after Nemanjić dynasty.

See also 
 Nemanjić dynasty
 Orders, decorations and medals of Republika Srpska

References

Orders, decorations, and medals of Republic of Srpska
Awards established in 1993